University of Exeter Medical School is a medical school in England. It is part of the University of Exeter and based at the St Luke's Campus and offers a five-year course leading to the award of the Bachelor of Medicine, Bachelor of Surgery (BMBS) degree.

History

The school was formed in 2013 as a successor to the Peninsula College of Medicine and Dentistry (PCMD). Before 2013, the BMBS degree was delivered through PCMD in conjunction with Plymouth University. In July 2018, the University of Exeter Medical School had its first cohort of graduates.

Course structure

The BMBS course is delivered at five sites across the Peninsula:
 St Luke's Campus, Exeter
 Royal Devon and Exeter Hospital, Exeter
 Royal Cornwall Hospital, Truro
 Torbay Hospital, Torquay
 North Devon District Hospital, Barnstaple

References 

Medical schools in England
University of Exeter
2013 establishments in England
Educational institutions established in 2013